St Vincent's Private Hospital Brisbane  (also known as Mt Olivet Hospital) is a hospital located in the suburb of Kangaroo Point in Brisbane, Queensland, Australia.

St Vincent's Private Hospital was established as part of St Vincent's Health Australia, the largest Catholic non-profit healthcare provider. 

The hospital redevelopment to increase its capacity and expand services was completed in 2010.

History

The land on which the hospital stands originally belonged to Dr Lilian Violet Cooper, Queensland's first female doctor and surgeon. After her death in 1947, Dr Cooper's lifelong friend Mary Josephine Bedford donated the land to the Sisters of Charity to establish a hospice for the sick and dying, particularly for those who were poor.

Transport
The hospital is accessible by bus
 234 Woolloongabba Bus Station – City
 234 City – Woolloongabba Bus Station (loop service)

References

Hospital buildings completed in 1957
Hospitals in Brisbane
Teaching hospitals in Australia
Hospitals established in 1954
Kangaroo Point, Queensland
Catholic hospitals in Oceania